is a Japanese athlete who specialises in long-distance events. She represented her country at the 2007 and 2011 World Championships. In addition, she won a silver medal at the 2006 Asian Games.

Competition record

Personal bests
Outdoor
1500 metres – 4:17.41 (Yokohama 2003)
3000 metres – 8:56.89 (Rovereto 2006)
5000 metres – 15:15.34 (Nobeoka 2007)
10,000 metres – 31:34.35 (Palo Alto 2011)
15 kilometres – 50:59 (Miyazaki 2007)
20 kilometres – 1:08:01 (Miyazaki 2007)
Half marathon – 1:11:35 (Miyazaki 2007)

References

1983 births
Living people
Sportspeople from Shimane Prefecture
Japanese female long-distance runners
Asian Games medalists in athletics (track and field)
Asian Games silver medalists for Japan
Athletes (track and field) at the 2006 Asian Games
Medalists at the 2006 Asian Games
World Athletics Championships athletes for Japan
Japan Championships in Athletics winners
20th-century Japanese women
21st-century Japanese women